The silvery-flanked antwren (Myrmotherula luctuosa) is an insectivorous bird in the antbird family Thamnophilidae. It is found in the coastal region of central Brazil.

Taxonomy
This species was described by the Austrian ornithologist August von Pelzeln in 1868 and given its current binomial name Myrmotherula luctuosa. It was formerly treated as a subspecies of the white-flanked antwren (Myrmotherula axillaris). The species is monotypic.

Description
The male is grey above with a black throat and belly. The female has a pale grey head, olive-grey back, brown wings and ochre underparts.

References

Myrmotherula
Birds described in 1868
Birds of Brazil